Drochlin  is a village in the administrative district of Gmina Lelów, within Częstochowa County, Silesian Voivodeship, in southern Poland.

The village has a population of 458 people according to the 2022 census. There is one grocery store, which appears to be the only source of commerce. This indicates that the residents prefer peace and quiet over the noise of the commercial services offered by neighboring villages of Koniecpol and Lelów. The previously mentioned north-west portion of the village was paved with asphalt, the first layer being laid approximately April 23, 2021 and the next and final layer before the long May weekend (May 1-3). A crushed limestone shoulder was completed during the first week of May 2021. Street signs, including a stop sign and signs indicating the main route and side streets, were added between May 10-13, 2021. During the late winter and early spring of 2021 a sidewalk on the south side of the village was extended to almost reach another village shrine and ultimately the parish cemetery. On May 9, 2021 within a 1.9 km stretch between Drochlin and Koniecpol to the north along route 794, there were 3 stork nests and 5 storks visible.

History

The first mention of the village occurred in 1373-74. During the Middle Ages the village belonged to the Chapter of the Roman Catholic Diocese of Kraków. There is a parish church named of Our Lady of Częstochowa. The original church, Saints Phillip and James, was built from wood and existed since 1470. After an unknown destruction, the next was built in 1728. That church had, from a bird's eye view, the shape of a cross. That church lasted until 1958, when it was demolished for structural reasons. Head priest Władysław Zachariasz oversaw its rebuild that lasted until 1967 and used light reddish-orange medium sized exterior bricks. A similar wooden church still exists and can be seen in the neighboring village of Podlesie.

In the late 18th century, the village was annexed by Prussia during the Partitions of Poland. In 1807, it was regained by Poles and included in the short-lived Duchy of Warsaw, and following its dissolution in 1815, it fell to the Russian Partition of Poland. During the January Uprising, on September 28, 1863, the village was a place of concentration of two units of Polish insurgents and a unit of Hungarian volunteers, who two days later fought the Battle of Mełchów, in which they defeated Russian troops. Following World War I, in 1918, Poland regained independence and control of the village.

In the early 1970s there was a fire in the northwestern portion of the village. There a villager discovered an object that was later confirmed by archeology professors from the Jagiellonian University in Kraków. The object was a Roman Denarius dating from Hadrian's rule, 119-30 AD.

O

References

Drochlin